Christopher Joseph Mudgett (born December 14, 1982) is an American artist known for his monochromatic artworks; primarily oil paintings, drawings, and sculptures.

He lives and works in the historic Whitley Heights district of Los Angeles.

Early Years 

Since childhood, Mudgett has always shown an interest in art. At the age of nine he visited the Barnes Collection in Merion, Pennsylvania, where he had a first taste of what was possible in painting. His first meeting with the great masters like Van Gogh, Cézanne and Picasso opened his eyes to the possibility of what art can do, not only for the human spirit, but also as a way of transforming abstract ideas into something that can to be universally shared and understood. However, his journey into the visual arts world does not begin until 2011, after 15 years of music career, when he felt he needed a more immediate and direct form of self-expression to satisfy his creative impulses.

Artistic Style 

A stylistic descendant of the cubist movement, Mudgett adds a nostalgic, reflective fingerprint to the genre. Oftentimes rendering his subjects with a single, continuous line, he uses the fluidity of shapes to explore the genuine naïveté of his subjects.

Exhibitions 

Since 2012, Mudgett has exhibited his work in numerous galleries and art fairs across the country, such as LA Art Show and Art Basel Miami Beach.

Collections 

Christopher Mudgett's artwork is currently held in private collections around the world, including North & Central America, Great Britain, Singapore, Denmark, Spain, Germany, France, and China.

References

Living people
American painters
1982 births